An alpaca is a South American camelid.

Alpaca or ALPACA may also refer to:

 Alpaca fiber, the fleece of the Alpaca
 ALCAPA (tectonic plate), see 
 Anomalous left coronary artery from the pulmonary artery, a rare congenital anomaly
 Dynetics Autonomous Logistics Platform for All-Moon Cargo Access (ALPACA), the Dynetics entry for the NASA Human Landing System lunar lander competition

See also
 Grass Mud Horse, a parody originating from Mainland China of 2009 that features the alpaca
 Alpacca, nickel silver